Manuel Figueiredo de Oliveira (20 October 1940 – 19 October 2017) was a Portuguese long-distance runner. He competed in the men's 5000 metres at the 1960 Summer Olympics.

References

External links

1940 births
2017 deaths
Athletes (track and field) at the 1960 Summer Olympics
Athletes (track and field) at the 1964 Summer Olympics
Athletes (track and field) at the 1968 Summer Olympics
Portuguese male long-distance runners
Portuguese male steeplechase runners
Olympic athletes of Portugal